Ashatu Kijaji (born 26 April 1976) is a Tanzanian academic and politician belonging to the ruling Chama Cha Mapinduzi (CCM) party. She is a Member of Parliament for Kondoa Constituency in Dodoma Region and the Minister of the newly established Ministry of Investment, Industry and Trade since January 10, 2022.

Background and education
Kijaji was born on April 26, 1976, in Kondoa District, Dodoma Region. She completed her primary school in Kalamba Primary School in 1990, then completed her Ordinary level secondary education in Kilakala secondary school in 1994 and thereafter from 1995 to 1997 joined Shinyanga Commercial School commonly known as SHYCOM for her Advanced level secondary education. In 2001, she received her Advanced Diploma in Economic Planning from the then Institute of Development Management - Mzumbe which is equivalent to Bachelor of Science in Economics currently offered by now Mzumbe University. She then acquired her Master of Science in Business Administration specialized in International Management from the University of Agder, Norway in 2008. She also acquired her PhD in International Management Majoring in Economics frm the same University of Agder, Norway in 2013.

She worked as a Planning Officer for the Kisarawe District Council from March 2002 to August 2002 and then as an Assistant Lecturer from 2005 to 2009, Lecturer in Development Economics and International Management from 2009 to 2012 and Senior Lecturer in DevelopmentEconomics and International Management from July 2012 to October 2015 at her alma mater Mzumbe University where she later became the Director of Planning.

Political career
Kijaji became involved with the ruling Chama Cha Mapinduzi party in 2004. She first became a Member of Parliament after she won as the ruling CCM party's candidate for Kondoa in the 2015 Tanzanian general election. She faced Yasin Shabani of the Civic United Front and two other minor candidates. She won receiving 37,795 votes to Shabani's 23,570.

Kijaji was appointed Deputy Minister in the Ministry of Finance and Planning in the newly elected President John Magufuli's administration in December 2015. As part of this role, she in involved in the drafting of the second Five Year Development Plan, which she presented to Parliament in February 2016. The plan seeks to encouraging industrialization to drive economic growth and social development. She was appointed Minister for investment, trade and industry in January 2022.

Publications

Books and research reports

Kijaji, Ashatu (2020). Kamsese Kametaga: Taarifa ya Utekelezaji wa Ilani ya CCM Jimbo la Kondoa 2015 hadi 2020.
Kijaji, Ashatu (2018). Kamsese Kametaga: Taarifa ya Utekelezaji wa Ilani ya CCM Jimbo la Kondoa 2015 hadi 2018.
Kijaji, Ashatu (2013). THE INFLUENCES ON AND PERCEPTIONS OF FRINGE BENEFITS: Evidence from Local and Foreign Companies in Tanzania. Doctoral Dissertation at the University of Agder 72; ISSN: 1504–9272; ISBN 978-7117-749-2
Kijaji, Ashatu and Kachwamba, M. (2009). Determinants of Firms’ Export Performance: Empirical Evidence from Tanzanian Manufacturing Firms. VDM Publisher, ISBN 978-3-639-19419-7.
Kijaji, Ashatu and Mwagike L. (2006). Challenges and Opportunities of Implementing HIV/AIDS Education in Tanzania Primary Schools: The Case of Kisarawe District Council. Research Report. ISBN 9987 617-73-5. Mzumbe University, Tanzania.
Kijaji, A and Nsimbila, P. (2005). Violence in Marriage in Tanzania: The Case of Shinyanga and Tabora. Research Report No. 42, ISBN 9987 617-54-9 Mzumbe University, Tanzania.

Refereed journals

Kijaji, Ashatu & Kachwamba, Muhajir, (2011). Low Quality Products in Developing Countries’ Market. Is it one of Globalization Challenges? International Review of Social Sciences and Humanities, Vol. 2(1), pp 26–36
Kijaji, Ashatu (2011). Employees’ Awareness and Perceptions of Fringe Benefit Packages: A Case of Local and Foreign Owned Companies in Tanzania. International Journal of Business and Management Studies, Vol. 3(2), pp 43–53
Kijaji, Ashatu (2011). The Influence of Labor Market Institutions in Designing Employees’ Fringe Benefit Packages: A Case of Local and Multinational Banks in Tanzania. International Journal of Humanities and Social Sciences, Vol.1(5), pp 94–104
Kijaji, Ashatu & Mwakasangula, E. (2010). Environmental conflicts between farmers and pastoralists: A burning issue in Kilosa District-Tanzania. African Affairs Journal, Vol. 27 (2), pp. 121–150
Kijaji, Ashatu (2009). The Use of Triangulation in Social Sciences Research: Can Qualitative and Quantitative Methods be Combined? Journal of Comparative Social Work, Vol. 1, pp 1–12 (With 930+ Citations to date)
Kachwamba, M and Kijaji, Ashatu. (2009). Determinants of E-government maturity: Do Organizational Specific Factors Matter? US-China Public Administration, Vol. 6, pp 1–7
Kachwamba, M & Kijaji, Ashatu (2008). Factors Influencing Literacy Rate in Tanzania. Uongozi Journal of Management & Development Dynamics, ISSN 0856-1435.

Refereed conference proceedings

Kachwamba, M. & Kijaji, A. (2009). Role of e-information on the Ex-ante Transaction Cost Facing Foreign Investors in Developing Economies. In Hahamis, P. (Ed. 9th European Conference on e-Government. Academic Publishing Limited, ISBN 978-906638-33-7, University of Westminster, London, UK
Kijaji, A and Kachwamba, M (2009). The Influence of Country-Of-Origin on Human Resource Strategy of Multinational Companies in Developing Countries. Selected papers published in the proceedings of the 2009 International Conference on Advanced Management Science (ICAMS 2009), Singapore, pp 368–372, ISBN 978-0-7695-3653-8
Kachwamba, M and Kijaji, A (2009). Determinants of E-government maturity: Do Organizational Specific Factors Matter? Kaplan, A; Akta, C and Dalbay, O (editors). Selected Proceedings of the First International Conference on e-government and e-governance held on 12–13 March 2009 Ankara, Turksat and Social Science Research Society, pp 67–78, ISBN 975-6339-00-0
Kijaji, A and Kachwamba, M (2009). Perceptions on Barriers Towards Exporting: Case of Tanzanian Manufacturing Small and Medium Size Enterprises (SMEs). Kocak, A; Abimbola, T; Ozer, A and Watkins-Mathys, L (editors). Marketing and Entrepreneurship. Ankara, Siyasal Yayinevi Tum Haklari Saklidir, pp 145–158, ISBN 978-605-5782-06-1
Kijaji, Ashatu. (2011). Employees’ awareness and perceptions of fringe benefit packages: A case of local and foreign owned companies in Tanzania. The International Conference on Business and Management - Organized by the Social Sciences Research Society, held in Izmir-Turkey 15 – 17 April 2011
Kijaji, Ashatu & Newenham-Kahindi, A. (2010). The influence of labor market institutions in designing the structure and value of fringe benefit packages: A case of local and multinational banks in Tanzania". International Symposium on HRM and the creation of effective organizations in Africa - Special Call by the: International Journal of Human Resource Management, Nottingham Business School, UK, 13 – 14 October 2010

References

1976 births
Living people